Summerberry is an organized hamlet in the Rural Municipality of Wolseley No. 155, Saskatchewan, Canada that previously held village status until December 31, 1972. It is located between the towns of Wolseley and Grenfell on Highway 1 (the Trans Canada Highway), 15 km east of Wolseley.

History 
Summerberry was originally incorporated as a village. It was restructured as an organized hamlet under the jurisdiction of the Rural Municipality of Wolseley No. 155 on December 31, 1972.

See also 
List of communities in Saskatchewan

References 

Wolseley No. 155, Saskatchewan
Former villages in Saskatchewan
Organized hamlets in Saskatchewan
Populated places disestablished in 1972
Division No. 5, Saskatchewan